Leroy Kelly (born May 20, 1942) is an American former professional football player who was a running back for the Cleveland Browns in the National Football League (NFL) from 1964 to 1973. He was inducted into the Pro Football Hall of Fame.

Career
Kelly had attended Simon Gratz High School in Philadelphia and Morgan State University in Baltimore. He was selected by the Browns in the eighth round of the 1964 NFL Draft. As a Cleveland rookie he was a key return man, averaging 24.3 yards per return and contributing to the Browns' 1964 NFL championship, and backup running back behind featured fullback Jim Brown and blocking halfback Ernie Green.  He moved up to become the Browns' featured running back after Brown's retirement at the end of the 1965 season.

When Jim Brown retired before the 1966 season, Kelly became the starter. For the next three years, he rushed for 1,000 yards, led the NFL in rushing touchdowns, and won All-NFL and starting Pro Bowl honors. Kelly also played in three other Pro Bowls following the 1969, 1970 and 1971 seasons, and earned first-team All-NFL in 1969 and 1971. In 1968, he scored a touchdown in a franchise-record 12 games, and two-or-more touchdowns in a franchise-record 7. In game 12 of the 1970 season, he passed Bill Brown as the career rushing-yards leader among active players, a position he maintained until his retirement in 1974. Kelly led the NFL in rushing for two consecutive seasons (1967–1968). He also was a talented punt and kick returner, who averaged 10.5 yards per punt return and 23.5 yards per kick return for his career.

Kelly ended his pro career with the Chicago Fire of the World Football League in 1974, rushing for 315 yards (4.1 average) and catching 8 passes for 128 yards (16.0 average).

At the time of his retirement Kelly, had rushed for 7,274 yards (then 4th all-time to Jim Brown, Joe Perry, and Jim Taylor) and 74 touchdowns (3rd) on 1,727 carries for 4.2 yards per carry.  He also caught 190 passes for 2,281 yards and 13 touchdowns. On special teams, he returned 94 punts for 990 yards and 3 touchdowns, and 76 kickoffs for 1,784 yards.  Overall, he gained 12,330 all-purpose yards and scored 90 touchdowns. He was named All-NFL five times and to six Pro Bowls.

After his retirement as an active player, he remained in the World Football League as the Philadelphia Bell's offensive backfield coach, joining two other Hall of Famers on that staff, former Green Bay Packers defensive backfield standouts Willie Wood (the first black head coach in pro football history) and Herb Adderley (defensive coordinator).

Kelly was voted to the Pro Football Hall of Fame in 1994.

Family
Pat Kelly, his younger brother, was an All-Star outfielder who played for five teams during a 15-year Major League Baseball career. Felicia Kelly, only daughter, worked in news 20 years at WEWS Newschannel 5; engineering department, news source reporter, hosted a half-hour entertainment show called,"The Set" in Cleveland, Ohio. Now an educator in the Cleveland Public School System.  David Kelly, his eldest son, is sports anchor and reporter for KMSB-TV in Tucson, Arizona. Leroy Kelly II his second son, played 3 years in the American Indoor Football League and 1 year overseas in the GFL Germany League For the Kiel-Baltic Hurricanes. Leroy Kelly II was invited to 2 workouts with the Cleveland Browns and 1 with the Detroit Lions.

References

External links
 Pro Football Hall of Fame: Member – Leroy Kelly
 

1942 births
Living people
American football running backs
Cleveland Browns players
Chicago Fire (WFL) players
Morgan State Bears football players
Philadelphia Bell coaches
American Conference Pro Bowl players
Eastern Conference Pro Bowl players
Pro Football Hall of Fame inductees
Sportspeople from Philadelphia
Players of American football from Philadelphia
African-American coaches of American football
African-American players of American football
21st-century African-American people
20th-century African-American sportspeople